Mark Slonaker (born February 14, 1957) was an American college basketball coach. He is the former head coach of the Mercer Bears men's basketball team. He was the 2002–03 Jim Phelan National Coach of the Year after leading Mercer to the best one season turnaround in NCAA history, improving from 6–23 to 23–6. The team won the Atlantic Sun regular season championship with a 14–2 conference record and made school history for number of wins (23); Mercer won 22 games in 1923–24 and 1984–85. The season ended with a loss in the Atlantic Sun tournament. Slonaker was the first National Coach of the Year to receive the award after it was named in honor of Jim Phelan. Slonaker's contract was not renewed after the 2007–08 season.

Slonaker grew up in Rahway, New Jersey, where he played prep basketball at Rahway High School. He was a four-year Letterman at the University of Georgia under Hugh Durham from 1975 to 1979. He was named co-captain during his senior year.  He graduated with a B.A. in Education before attending Georgia State University where he earned a Masters in Sports Administration. From 2009 to 2015, Slonaker served as the radio color commentator for the Georgia Bulldogs Men's Basketball team. From 2011 to 2015, Slonaker was the executive director of the Georgia Bulldog Club. Slonaker has served in his current role, executive director of athletics alumni relations, since 2015 for University of Georgia Athletics.

References

1957 births
Living people
American men's basketball coaches
American men's basketball players
Basketball coaches from New Jersey
Basketball players from New Jersey
College men's basketball head coaches in the United States
Georgia Bulldogs basketball coaches
Georgia Bulldogs basketball players
Georgia State Panthers men's basketball coaches
High school basketball coaches in the United States
Junior college men's basketball coaches in the United States
Mercer Bears men's basketball coaches
Rahway High School alumni
Sportspeople from Rahway, New Jersey
Pensacola State Pirates men's basketball coaches